Marián Timm (born 7 January 1990 in Nová Baňa) is a Slovak football striker who currently plays for the Slovak 2. liga club ŠK SFM Senec. He previously played for SK Dynamo České Budějovice.

External links

SK Dynamo České Budějovice profile

References

1990 births
Living people
Slovak footballers
Association football forwards
SK Dynamo České Budějovice players
ŠK Slovan Bratislava players
FK Inter Bratislava players
Czech First League players
ŠK Senec players
FK Čáslav players
Expatriate footballers in the Czech Republic